Fishkill or Fish Kill is derived from the Dutch term Vis Kill, meaning "creek full of fish".

Fishkill or Fish Kill may also refer to:

Communities
Fishkill (town), New York, a town in Dutchess County
Fishkill, New York, a village within the above town
East Fishkill, New York, a town in Dutchess County

Other
Fish kill, a localized die-off of fish and/or other aquatic populations
Fishkill Correctional Facility, a medium security prison in Dutchess County
Fishkill Creek, a tributary of the Hudson River
Fishkill Farms, Dutchess County, New York

See also
East Fishkill Fire District, a volunteer firefighting organization in southern Dutchess County